Lycée Jacques de Vaucanson is a senior high school/sixth-form college in Tours, Indre-et-Loire, France.

It opened in 1989 and moved into a new building in 2012.

The school includes a boarding facility.

References

External links
 Lycée Vaucanson 

Lycées in Indre-et-Loire
Buildings and structures in Tours, France
Education in Tours, France
Boarding schools in France
1989 establishments in France
Educational institutions established in 1989